Dolores Saez (born 10 January 1979) is a Spanish diver. She competed at the 1996 Summer Olympics, the 2000 Summer Olympics and the 2004 Summer Olympics.

References

1979 births
Living people
Spanish female divers
Olympic divers of Spain
Divers at the 1996 Summer Olympics
Divers at the 2000 Summer Olympics
Divers at the 2004 Summer Olympics
Divers from Madrid